Kamai is a village in the Indian state of Uttar Pradesh. It is located in Goverdhan tehsil of Mathura district, and in the 2011 census its population was 6,916.

References 

Villages in Mathura district